Wormwood is the eleventh studio album by Swedish black metal band Marduk. It was recorded at Endarker Studio by Magnus Devo Andersson and released on 21 September in Europe and 13 October in U.S. by Regain Records. It is the first Marduk album to feature drummer Lars Broddesson. "Phosphorous Redeemer" was made available on the band's official MySpace page in the run-up to the album's release.

Track listing

Credits

Marduk
Marduk - songwriting (1–5, 7–10) music (6) 
 Mortuus – vocals
 Morgan (Morgan Steinmeyer Håkansson) – guitar
 Devo (Magnus Andersson) – bass; engineering, production
 Lars Broddesson – drums

Other personnel
Belfagor (Mika Hakola) - lyrics (6)

Charts

References

2009 albums
Marduk (band) albums
Regain Records albums